Terashima (written: 寺島 or 寺嶋; sometimes read Terajima) is a Japanese surname. Notable people with the surname include:

 Kazuya Terashima a.k.a. Izumi Matsumoto (born 1958), Japanese manga artist
 Manji Terashima (1898–1983), Japanese photographer
 Naho Terashima (born 1993), Japanese ice hockey player
, Japanese baseball player
 Reiko Terashima (born 1958), Japanese yonkoma manga artist and illustrator
 Takuma Terashima (born 1983), Japanese voice actor
 Terashima Munenori (1832–1893), diplomat in Meiji period Japan
 Yū Terashima (born 1949), Japanese manga artist

Japanese-language surnames